William "Vasile" Yurko MLA MP (February 11, 1926 – February 2, 2010) was a Canadian politician, and member of the Legislative Assembly of Alberta and the House of Commons of Canada.

Yurko was born in 1926 in Hairy Hill, Alberta of Romanian and Ukrainian descent. He served two years in the Royal Canadian Air Force during World War II, then graduated with distinction as a chemical engineer from the University of Alberta. He worked for 17 years (six of them within the Atomic Energy of Canada) before 1969, when he entered politics.

He was elected Member of the Legislative Assembly (MLA) as a candidate of the Progressive Conservative Association of Alberta in the Strathcona East riding by-election on February 10, 1969, following the resignation of Premier Ernest Manning.

He was elected to the Legislative Assembly  for the Edmonton Gold Bar riding in 1971 and re-elected in 1975.

In 1979 he was elected to the House of Commons for the Edmonton East riding as a candidate of the Progressive Conservative Party of Canada, and he held the seat until 1984, when he ran as an  Independent for the same riding, but lost to William Lesick.

In 1971, he held the portfolio of Environment Minister in the Alberta Cabinet.
In 1977, he held the portfolio of Housing and Public Works Minister.
1979–1984, he was a Member of Parliament in the 31st and 32nd Canadian Parliaments.
On September 23, 1983, he tabled Bill C-691 (and on March 14, 1984, tried again with Bill C-228) to pardon Louis Riel. The act was not passed until 1992.
After 1985 he was a Member of the Senate and Board of Governors of the University of Alberta.

References

Members of the Executive Council of Alberta
Members of the House of Commons of Canada from Alberta
Progressive Conservative Association of Alberta MLAs
Progressive Conservative Party of Canada MPs
1926 births
2010 deaths
Canadian people of Ukrainian descent
Canadian people of Romanian descent
Farmers from Alberta
20th-century Canadian politicians
Royal Canadian Air Force personnel of World War II